The dotted miner bee (Andrena cressonii) is a species of miner bee in the family Andrenidae. Another common name for this species is Cresson's andrena. It is found in North America.

Subspecies
These three subspecies belong to the species Andrena cressonii:
 Andrena cressonii cressonii Robertson, 1891
 Andrena cressonii infasciata Lanham, 1949
 Andrena cressonii kansensis Cockerell, 1899

References

Further reading

External links

 

cressonii
Articles created by Qbugbot
Insects described in 1891